Canna leaf roller refers to two different Lepidoptera species that are pests of cultivated cannas. Caterpillars of the Brazilian skipper butterfly (Calpodes ethlius), also known as the larger canna leaf roller, cut the leaves and roll them over to live inside while pupating and eating the leaf.  In addition, caterpillars of the lesser canna leaf roller (Geshna cannalis), a grass moth, will sew the leaves shut before they can unfurl by spinning a silk thread around the leaf. The resultant leaf damage can be distressing to a gardener.

References

External links
Galveston County Master Gardener Association
Butterflies and Moths of North America: Brazilian Skipper

Garden pests
 
Insect common names